Theodore Richard Stanley (April 26, 1931 – January 3, 2016) was an American entrepreneur and philanthropist. He co-founded the Danbury Mint with business partner Ralph Glendinning, which was then a subsidiary of MBI Inc.

Early life
Born in Reading, Pennsylvania, Stanley graduated from University of Pennsylvania. He then served in the United States Air Force and was an intelligence officer. Stanley worked for Procter & Gamble in the marketing division in Cincinnati, Ohio.

Business
Stanley became a billionaire during his lifetime, earning his wealth through the founding the Danbury Mint, which has a business of selling collectibles by mail order, such as commemorative postage stamps, decorative plates, and other such items. His company's first product was a medal series that commemorated the Apollo 11 first manned moon landing. After this, the business continued to expand.

Connection to mental health

In 1988, Stanley's son was diagnosed with bipolar disorder at the age of 19 after having a psychiatric episode that saw him running around New York streets for 3 days and stripping off his clothes in public. His son was eventually helped with a lithium treatment, and eventually finished college and law school, but during the course of his son's treatment he met many parents who were not so lucky, whose children did not improve after treatment. In response, Stanley started donating to mental health research.

Philanthropy

Stanley died in his sleep in New Canaan, Connecticut. Before he died, Stanley made a large donation to the Broad Institute of Cambridge, MA of approximately $650 million for research into genetic markers of mental health. It is recognized as one of the largest private donations ever to support scientific research and the largest ever for mental health research. Before his estates large $650 million donation, which comprised the majority of Stanley's financial holdings, he had periodically donated an additional $175 million, making his lifetime contribution to the Broad Institute $825 million, to support work and research.

References

1931 births
2016 deaths
People from Reading, Pennsylvania
University of Pennsylvania alumni
Businesspeople from Pennsylvania
American company founders
American billionaires
Giving Pledgers
21st-century philanthropists
20th-century American businesspeople
20th-century American philanthropists